Ssanggyesa is a head temple of the Jogye Order of Korean Buddhism.  It is located on the southern slopes of Jirisan, southwest of sacred Samshin-bong Peak, in the Hwagye-dong Valley of Hwagae-myeon, Hadong County, in the province of Gyeongsangnam-do, South Korea.  

The temple was founded in 722 by two disciples of Uisang named Sambeop and Daebi.  It is said that they were guided to the location by a Jiri-sanshin in the form of a tiger, after being instructed by him in dreams to look for a site where arrowroot flowers 
blossomed through the snow.  They had travelled China for study, and returned with the skull of and a portrait of "Yukcho" (Hui-neng, the Sixth Patriarch of Seon [Zen] Buddhism) which they respectively buried under the Main Hall and enshrined in it (the skull was later dug up and enshrined in a stone pagoda, which is still there).

In the 9th century the temple was renamed "Ssanggyesa" (Twin-Streams Monastery) by Jingam (Meditaition-Master Jin-gam-seonsa, 774–850).  He is also credited with creation of Beompae (Korean-style Buddhist music & dance) after having studied Chinese Buddhist music in Tang Dynasty China.  He composed "Eosan" [Fish Mountain] with paleumryul [eight tones and rhythms] while watching fish swim in the nearby Seomjin River, and therefore the spacious lecture-pavilion still dedicated to Beompae performance and education at the front of Ssanggye-sa is named Palyeong-ru.  A stele dedicated to Jingam-seonsa and written by Choi Chi-won still stands in the temple; it is designated Republic of Korea National Treasure 47.  

Most of the rest of the temple dates to the 17th century or thereafter, because all its buildings were burned to the ground by Japanese invaders during the Seven Year War.

See also
Korean Buddhist temples
Korean Buddhism
Religion in South Korea

External links
Official site, in Korean
Tour2Korea profile
Photo gallery
KoreaTemple profile
David A. Mason's 4 pages on Ssanggye-sa

Buddhist temples of the Jogye Order
Religious organizations established in the 8th century
Buildings and structures in South Gyeongsang Province
Buddhist temples in South Korea
Hadong County
Tourist attractions in South Gyeongsang Province
8th-century establishments in Korea
Religious buildings and structures completed in 722